

The Bleriot 105 was a biplane passenger aircraft built by Louis Bleriot in the mid-1920s, derived from the SPAD S-45.

Specifications

References

1920s French airliners
105
Aircraft first flown in 1924
Four-engined piston aircraft